Bzovská Lehôtka is a village and municipality of the Zvolen District in the Banská Bystrica Region of Slovakia

History
In historical records, the village was first mentioned in 1524 as belonging to Hont. In 1786 it passed to Zvolen.

External links
https://web.archive.org/web/20071116010355/http://www.statistics.sk/mosmis/eng/run.html.  
http://www.e-obce.sk/obec/bzovskalehotka/bzovska-lehotka.html

Villages and municipalities in Zvolen District